Silvio Spann (born 21 August 1981) is a Trinidad and Tobagonian footballer who played professionally in countries including Italy, Japan, Croatia and England.

Spann is a midfielder. He is the son of Leroy Spann, former Trinidad and Tobago national team player who currently coaches a youth football team, the Middlesex Phantoms, in the MAPLE league in Massachusetts.

Club career
Spann has played in Italy, for Perugia and Sambenedettese. His move to Japan occurred after he failed to get a work permit in England, where Derby County and Crystal Palace were both interested in him.

Spann's contract with Japanese club Yokohama FC finished just before the 2006 World Cup, forcing him to return home where he re-signed for W Connection.

It was announced in July 2007 that Spann would be attending a two-week trial with Sunderland. He also spent time on trial at Sheffield United.

Silvio Spann later went on to sign a 3-year contract with Wrexham who play their football in the Football League Two after international teammates, and former Wrexham players, Carlos Edwards and Dennis Lawrence gave the club a glowing report. Silvio has been granted the number 16 shirt at Wrexham. He scored his first goal for the club in a 2–1 league defeat to Notts County, a game in which he later got sent off. He was transfer listed by Wrexham in May 2008 following the club's relegation to the Football Conference. Despite being transfer listed, he remained with the club until he was released at the end of the 2009–10 season.

International career
His international debut came against Barbados in July 2002. Spann had been named in the Trinidad and Tobago national team for the 2006 FIFA World Cup in Germany, but had to drop out after sustaining a hamstring injury in the run-up to the tournament.

On 7 June 2007, in the Gold Cup Tournament at the Home Depot Center in Carson, Silvio Spann scored a spectacular free kick more than 40 meters out against El Salvador, but Trinidad & Tobago were defeated 2–1.

Club statistics

National team statistics

International goals
Scores and results list T&T's goal tally first.
 

Source

Personal life
His younger brother Silas Spann of Joe Public F.C. is currently member of the Trinidad and Tobago national football team.

References

External links
 
 Soca Warriors Online
 

1981 births
Living people
Trinidad and Tobago footballers
Trinidad and Tobago international footballers
Trinidad and Tobago expatriate footballers
2005 CONCACAF Gold Cup players
2007 CONCACAF Gold Cup players
Association football midfielders
W Connection F.C. players
TT Pro League players
A.C. Perugia Calcio players
A.S. Sambenedettese players
Expatriate footballers in Italy
GNK Dinamo Zagreb players
Expatriate footballers in Croatia
Yokohama FC players
J2 League players
Expatriate footballers in Japan
Expatriate footballers in Wales
Wrexham A.F.C. players
English Football League players
Trinidad and Tobago expatriate sportspeople in Italy
Trinidad and Tobago expatriate sportspeople in Croatia
Trinidad and Tobago expatriate sportspeople in Japan
Trinidad and Tobago expatriate sportspeople in Wales